Micheál Ó Conghaile (born 1962) is an Irish-language writer who lives in Indreabhán, County Galway, Ireland. He was born on the island of Inishtravin in Conamara and was raised in an Irish-speaking community.

Cló Iar-Chonnacht

In 1985 Ó Conghaile founded Irish-language publishing company Cló Iar-Chonnacht. It publishes books, music and spoken word albums. It is one of the few such companies that employ full-time editors, and he founded it because many Conamara writers were still unpublished. He believes in the importance both of popular works and a high literary standard.

His own work includes short stories, a novel, drama, poetry and history. He has translated Martin McDonagh's plays The Beauty Queen of Leenane and The Lonesome West. Ó Conghaile's awards include The Butler Literary Award of the Irish American Cultural Institute (1997) and the 1997 Hennessy Literary Award for his short story "Athair".

He was writer in residence at Queen's University, Belfast, and at the University of Ulster at Coleraine between 1999 and 2002. His works have been translated into Romanian, Croatian, Albanian, German and English.

Bibliography

 Mac an tSagairt, Gallimh, Cló Iar-Chonnacht, 1986
 Comhrá Caillí, 1987
 Up Seanamhach!, 1990
 Conamara agus Árainn 1880–1980, 1993
 Gnéithe d’Amhráin Chonamara ár Linne, 1993
 An Fear a Phléasc, 1997
 Sna Fir, 1999
 Seachrán Jeaic Sheáin Johnny, 2002
 An Fear nach nDéanann Gáire, 2003
 Cúigear Chonamara/The Connemara Five, Úna Ní Chonchúir, 2007
 Jude/Gaeilgeoir Deireanach Charna/Incubus, with Breandán Ó hEaghra and Caitríona Ní Chonaola, 2007
 Cúigear Chonamara/The Connemara Five, Úna Ní Chonchúir, 2007
 Go dTaga do Ríocht, 2009
 Na Trí Mhialtóg, 2012
 Diabhlaíocht Dé, 2015
 Sa Teach Seo Anocht, 2019

References

People from County Galway
Irish writers
Irish publishers (people)
1962 births
Living people
20th-century Irish people
21st-century Irish people
Irish-language writers